Mkhitar Sparapet (sparapet meaning "general-in-chief") (?  1730), also known as Mkhitar Bek, was an 18th-century Armenian military commander and participant in the Armenian armed rebellion in the Syunik region of Transcaucasia. He was instrumental in David Bek's victories over the forces of Safavid Iran and the Ottoman Empire in Armenia's Syunik region. Their main headquarters were at the fortress of Halidzor which also served as the administrative center for Syunik. Mkhitar served as chief aide to David Bek and later his successor after his death in 1728.

After the Ottomans captured and destroyed Halidzor fortress, Mkhitar managed to escape and continue a guerrilla campaign against the invaders. However, the Armenian forces faced replenished Ottoman forces, lacked a single headquarters and were plagued by internal disagreements. In 1730, Mkhitar was murdered by Armenian villagers of Khndzoresk, who had implored him to have his own fortifications destroyed during his conflicts rather than their village. His head was presented to the Ottoman Pasha at Tabriz, who found this act of treachery detestable and had the murderers decapitated. The tomb of Mkhitar Sparapet is located in a gorge not far from Nerkin Khndzoresk and Old Khndzoresk. The inscription on the tomb, which incorrectly dates Mkhitar's death to 1726, writes that he was "from the land of Ganja" and "died young without having reached his goal."

Mkhitar's death marked the end of the 18th-century Armenian liberation struggle in Syunik. However, oral traditions from Syunik hold that Armenian resistance continued under different leaders until Nader drove out the Ottomans and restored Iranian control over Transcaucasia in 1735.

Popular culture 
Mkhitar is one of the characters of the Soviet film David Bek, released in 1944. The novel Mkhitar Sparapet by Sero Khanzadyan was published in 1961. A film about Mkhitar Sparapet directed by Edmond Keosayan titled Huso astgh ("Star of Hope") was released in 1978 by Armenfilm and Mosfilm, with Armen Dzhigarkhanyan playing the role of Mkhitar; the film enjoyed success in Soviet Armenia.

Sparapet Day 

Sparapet Day is a public holiday in Armenia that is commemorated on 12 September, honoring the memory of Mkhitar Sparapet. The President of Armenia, the Prime Minister of Armenia, and the Defence Minister attend the official celebrations. Mkhitar Sparapet's tomb in Khndzoresk, Syunik Province is the focal point of the celebrations.

References

Sources 
 
 
 
 
 

Year of birth missing
Sparapets
Armenian revolutionaries
1730 deaths
Armenian generals